Channel Chaos is a 1985 Australian film set at a TV station.

Plot
The actors of the TV series Copfile investigate when their scriptwriter is killed.

Production
The film was the second of four movies made by the team of Barry Peak and Chris Kiely who ran the Valhalla Cinemas in Sydney and Melbourne. The movie was known in production as A Hatful of Arseholes and the budget was raised through 10BA. Peak and Kiely hated the movie when they finished and decided not to screen it in their own cinema.

References

External links

Australian comedy films
1980s English-language films
1985 comedy films
1980s Australian films